Biabanak may refer to:
 Biabanak Rural District
 Biabanak, alternate name of Bayazeh